Maximilian Anton Lamoral, Hereditary Prince of Thurn and Taxis, full German name: Maximilian Anton Lamoral Erbprinz von Thurn und Taxis (28 September 1831 – 26 June 1867) was the Hereditary Prince of Thurn and Taxis from birth until his death in 1867.

Marriage and family
Maximilian was the son of Maximilian Karl, 6th Prince of Thurn and Taxis, and Baroness Wilhelmine of Dörnberg. He married Duchess Helene in Bavaria, daughter of Duke Maximilian Joseph in Bavaria and his wife, Princess Ludovika of Bavaria, on 24 August 1858 at Possenhofen Castle. Helene was the eldest sister of Elisabeth of Bavaria (later Empress of Austria). Maximilian and Helene had four children:

 Princess Louise of Thurn and Taxis, married Prince Frederick of Hohenzollern-Sigmaringen (1 June 1859 – 20 June 1948)
 Princess Elisabeth of Thurn and Taxis, married Miguel, Duke of Braganza (28 May 1860 – 7 February 1881)
 Maximilian Maria, 7th Prince of Thurn and Taxis (24 June 1862 – 2 June 1885)
 Albert, 8th Prince of Thurn and Taxis, married Archduchess Margarethe Klementine of Austria (8 May 1867 – 22 January 1952)

The marriage of Maximilian and Helene did not take place without difficulty as Maximilian II of Bavaria initially refused to let his first cousin marry a prince that was not of a royal house. Franz Joseph I of Austria and his wife Elisabeth of Bavaria intervened and the marriage took place as planned. Franz Joseph was originally intended to marry Helene, but fell in love with and married her sister Elisabeth instead.

Death
Maximilian died of either kidney failure or lung paralysis on 26 June 1867 at the age of 35 in Regensburg. He was interred in the burial chapel at St. Emmeram's Abbey. Due to his early death, his son Maximilian Maria became Hereditary Prince of Thurn and  Taxis and ultimately the princely house's seventh Prince.

Ludwig II of Bavaria wrote in a personal letter of condolence to Maximilian's father, Maximilian Karl:
"I sympathize with your loss the deep pain and just the same and the whole Taxis family feels and discretion very well what a lot of hopes with the dear passing away of life is extinguished."

Ancestry

References

1831 births
1867 deaths
People from Regensburg
German Roman Catholics
Knights of the Golden Fleece of Austria
Heirs apparent who never acceded
Hereditary Princes of Thurn and Taxis
Burials at the Gruftkapelle, St. Emmeram's Abbey